Wani is a semi-legendary scholar who is said to have been sent to Japan by Baekje of southwestern Korea during the reign of Emperor Ōjin. He used to be associated with the introduction of the Chinese writing system to Japan.

Original sources and analysis
Wani is mentioned only in Japanese history books; he is not recorded in Chinese or Korean sources. The main sources of Wani's biography are the Nihon Shoki (720) and the Kojiki (712).

These stories have long been questioned by scholars. Ten volumes are too much for the Analects, and more importantly, his alleged arrival predates the composition of the Thousand Character Classic (the early 6th century). Arai Hakuseki (1657–1725) considered that Wani had brought a certain book of Elementary Learning which the Kojiki had confused with the Thousand Character Classic. Motoori Norinaga (1730–1801) claimed that it was pointless to care about details because the Thousand Character Classic was mentioned just as a typical book of Elementary Learning. Some assume a different version of the Thousand Character Classic was brought but this theory has no clear basis. In short, it is not unnatural for people like Wani to have come to Japan around that time, but there is no strong evidence determining whether Wani really existed.

Dating the alleged arrival of Wani is rather difficult since there are long-lasting disputes over the accuracy of these sources on early events. According to the traditional dating, it would be 285 though is considered too early by historians. Based on the reign of King Akue (阿花王; identified as King Asin 阿莘王) of Baekje, who, according to the Nihon Shoki, died in the 16th year of Emperor Ōjin's reign, it would be 405. However, this theory contradicts the description of the Kojiki, which says that Wani's arrival was during the reign of King Shōko (照古王; usually identified as King Geunchogo 近肖古王, r. 346-375) of Baekje. The Kojiki suggests that Wani arrived sometime after 372.

His name is not straightforward either. The Kojiki calls him "Wani Kishi". The Nihon Shoki and most of the subsequent documents read 王仁. Although the reading Wani is irregular (the standard reading is Ō Jin or Ō Nin), these characters look like a Chinese name (the surname Wang and the personal name Ren). This leads some scholars to consider that Wani was of Chinese descent, which his descendants claim was the case. A supporting fact is that the Wang clan was powerful in China's former Lelang Commandery in northwestern Korea. After the downfall of the commandery around 313, some members of the Wang clan might have fled to Baekje, and then to Japan. A more skeptical view is that the legend of Wani was influenced by much later events: the surname Wang was selected as the most appropriate name for the ideal man of letters because in the late 6th century, several scholars surnamed Wang came to Japan from southern China via Baekje.

Descendants
The descendants of Wani, or more precisely, those who claimed Wani to be their ancestor, were collectively called the Kawachi no Fumi clan. They lived in Kisaichi of Kawachi Province together with their branch families. The head family had the uji "Fumi" [literature] after their duty as scribes, and similarly their branch families were given the kabane "Fuhito" [scribe].

Despite Wani's fame as a scholar, the Kawachi no Fumi clan was not so active as secretaries for administration. A rare exception was Fumi no Nemaro (文禰麻呂; ?-707). Instead of being active in civil administration, he rose to a rank unusually high for a mid-level bureaucrat for his military performances in the Jinshin War (672). Some historians consider that this was the reason why the legend of Wani was recorded in the Kojiki and the Nihon Shoki. It is known that scribes of foreign origin had similar and mutually conflicting legends about their founders. Features common in their stories include the arrival during the reign of Emperor Ōjin, the introduction of Chinese literature and/or Confucianism, and the surname Wang. The legend of Wani was chosen with the rest of them ignored because the Kawachi no Fumi clan was relatively powerful at the time of the compilation of the history books.

In 791 Wani's descendants including Fumi no Mooto (文最弟) and Takefu no Makata (武生真象) made a successful attempt to elevate their kabane or family rank. According to the Shoku Nihongi (797), their appeal was as follows:
Luan (鸞) was a descendant of Emperor Gaozu of Han. Luan's descendant Wang Gou (王狗) moved to Baekje. During the reign of King Kuso of Baekje, the imperial court sent envoys to summon literati. King Kuso offered Gou's grandson Wang Ren (Wani) as a tribute. He was the founder of Fumi, Takefu and other clans.
A similar story can be found in the description of the Fumi no Sukune (文宿禰) clan by the Shinsen Shōjiroku (815).

Later interpretations
The article of the Nihon Shoki was traditionally interpreted as the introduction of Confucianism and/or Chinese literature although not clearly stated in the history book.

According to the preface to the Kokin Wakashū (905), a famous Waka poem starting with "Naniwa-zu" was traditionally attributed to Wani. At that time, the imperial throne was vacant for three years because the future Emperor Nintoku (successor to Emperor Ōjin) and his brother Crown Prince Uji no Waki Iratsuko renounced succession to the throne to crown the other. Historians and philologists are skeptical about the attribution to Wani because it cannot be found in earlier sources.  From the early 10th century on, this poem was regarded as a chorus that praises Emperor Nintoku. As a result, Wani was portrayed as a sage submitting to the emperor's virtue.

From the Heian period onward, references to Wani mostly involved the Naniwa-zu poem. Some commentaries to Waka poems describe Wani as a man from Silla in southeastern Korea. Although this error was corrected by Fujiwara no Norikane's Waka dōmōshō (1145–53) and Kenshō's Kokinshū jo chū (1183) with the reference to the Nihon Shoki, it survived for a long time. To solve the contradiction, Reizei Tamesuke even claimed in 1297 that Wani had been transferred from Baekje to Silla and then from Silla to Japan. A possible reason for this error is that Wani's arrival at Japan was interpreted as a result of Empress Jingū's conquest of Silla, which was recorded in the Nihon Shoki.

Political exploitations

Hirakata
The so-called tomb of Wani is located in Hirakata, Osaka Prefecture. It is, however, most likely that the alleged tomb identified in the 18th century has nothing to do with Wani.

The "tomb" was located in Fujisaka Village, Kawachi Province (part of the modern-day Hirakata city). It was originally a pair of stones known to local people as "Oni Tomb" (於爾墓). In other words, they were not associated with Wani. The situation changed in 1731 when the Confucian scholar Namikawa Seisho (並河誠所) visited there for the purpose of compiling a geography monograph named Gokinaishi (五畿内志). He claimed that he discovered an old document at Wada Temple of Kin'ya Village (also part of the modern Hirakata) that read the name "Oni Tomb" was the corrupt form of Wani Tomb. At his recommendation, a stonetomb was built behind the stones. It is generally considered that the "tomb" in Hirakata is Namikawa's fabrication. There is no ancient record that refers to Wani's burial site. Archaeologically speaking, there was no such custom of setting a tombstone on a mound before the introduction of Buddhism.

The new myth spread as the Kokugaku movement became active. Wani was praised as a talented and faithful servant to the ancient emperors. In 1827, a monument in honor of Wani was erected near the tomb, on which his name was engraved by Prince Arisugawa. After the Meiji Restoration, a ceremony was held at the tomb in 1899 to commemorate the 1500-year anniversary of the death of Emperor Nintoku.

After the annexation of Korea, another symbolic role was given to Wani in relation to modern Korea/Koreans. As part of an effort to integrate Korea into the empire, conciliatory approaches were adopted. Wani was utilized as a historical precedent for serving the emperor loyally in spite of non-Japanese root. In 1927 a society was set up in Tokyo to build a shrine for Wani. Its member included Uchida Ryōhei from the Black Dragon Society. The project for building a shrine in the site of the Wani tomb began in 1930. In 1932 the society celebrated the 1650-year anniversary of Wani's arrival there. The construction of Wani shrine started in 1940 but was never completed. In addition to Wani Shrine, a pair of monuments was built in honor of Wani in Tokyo's Ueno Park in 1939.

With the disintegration of the Japanese Empire, the political role of Wani ceased to exist. Instead, Wani was targeted by Korean political exploitation. Koreans, in turn, use Wani as a symbol of ancient Korea's "cultural superiority" over Japan. Since the 1980s Korean nationals in Japan have led various events visualizing Wani's alleged arrival at Japan. President Kim Dae-jung sent a personal letter to a ceremony at the tomb in 1998, and Prime Minister Kim Jong-pil visited there in 1999.

Yeongam

Even though Korea has no historical records on Wani, "Doctor Wang In's Historical Sites" (Wang In is the Koreanized form of Wani, 왕인) are located in Gurim Village, Yeongam County, South Jeolla Province, South Korea today. It is based on a new myth that can date back only to the early 20th century.

Earlier geography books including the Taekriji (1751) never link Wani to Yeongam. The first known record that associates Wani with Yeongam is the Joseon Hwanyeo Seungnam (朝鮮寰輿勝覧; 1922–37) by Yi Byeong-yeon (이병연, 李秉延). It claims without providing any evidence that Wani was born in Yeongnam. It is known that around the same time, a Japanese monk named Aoki Keishō claimed on the basis of "oral tradition" that Yeongam was Wani's homeland. In 1932 he made a failed appeal to erect a bronze statue of Wani in Yeongam.

A new myth about Wangin was publicized in South Korea in the 1970s. In 1972 the social activist Kim Changsu reported a series of essays titled "Korean spirit embodied in Japan". In the framework of Korean national history, Wani was regarded as a Korean. Upon being informed by a reader from Yeongam, Kim issued a statement identifying Yeongam as the birthplace of Wani in the next year. In spite of the weakness of the evidence, Wani's "relic site" was designated as Cultural Asset No. 20 of South Jeolla Province in 1976.

The development of Wani's "historical sites" was led by the governments of South Jeolla Province and Yeongam County. The governor of South Jeolla Province was from Yeongam County. The construction was carried out from 1985 to 1987, "restoring" the "birthplace", schools where Wani allegedly studied, and others. Yeongam County started to fully exploit the old-looking new theme park as a tourist attraction because the introduction of local autonomy of 1990 forced the local government to look for its own source of revenue. For example, Youngam County began to host the annual "Wangin Culture Festival" in 1997 that was previously organized by local people under the name of "Cherry blossom festival". The exploitation was not done without opposition. In fact, it is criticized by a faction who attempts to use Buddhist monk Doseon (827–898) as the main tourism resource of Yeongam.

See also
Korean influence on Japanese culture

Notes

References
 Gotō Kōji 後藤耕二, Atogaki ni kaete, Den Wani bo o kaishita Daikan minkoku Zenra nandō Reigan-gun to no yūkō toshi mondai o megutte あとがきにかえて‐伝王仁墓を介した大韓民国全羅南道霊岩郡との友好都市問題をめぐって, Zainichi Chōsenjin no rekishi 在日朝鮮人の歴史, pp. 317–328頁, 1994.
 Kim Byeong-in 金秉仁: 王仁의 "지역 영웅화" 과정에 대한 문헌사적 검토, Hanguksa yeon-gu 韓國史研究, Vol.115, pp. 107–116, 2001
 Ōishi Kazuyo 大石和世: Densetsu o tooshite hyōshō sareru Nikkan kankei 伝説を通して表象される日韓関係 (The Relations of Korea and Japan as represented by a Legend), From Fukuoka: Asia Pacific Study Reports 福岡発・アジア太平洋研究報告, Vol. 13, pp. 1–7, 2004.

Confucianism in Japan
Chinese Confucianists
5th-century Chinese people